San Román may refer to:

Family 
San Roman (Surname)

Places

Belize
 San Román, Corozal
 San Román, Orange Walk
 San Román, Stann Creek

Peru
 San Román Province

Spain
Asturias
San Román, a parish in the municipality of Amieva
San Román, a parish in the municipality of Candamo
San Román, a parish in the municipality of Piloña
San Román, a parish in the municipality of Sariego

Castile-La Mancha
San Román de los Montes, municipality in the province of Toledo
San Román de Hornija, municipality in the province of Valladolid

Extremadura
Peraleda de San Román, municipality in the province of Cáceres

La Rioja
San Román de Cameros, municipality

Venezuela
Cape San Román